Jovani Morán (born April 24, 1997) is a Puerto Rican professional baseball pitcher for the Minnesota Twins of Major League Baseball (MLB). He made his MLB debut in 2021.

Career
Morán was drafted by the Minnesota Twins in the seventh round of the 2015 Major League Baseball Draft out of the Carlos Beltran Baseball Academy in Florida, Puerto Rico.  He made his professional debut that year with the Gulf Coast Twins.

After missing 2016 due to injury, Morán played 2017 with the Elizabethton Twins. He spent 2018 with the Cedar Rapids Kernels and Fort Myers Miracle and 2019 with the Pensacola Blue Wahoos and Gulf Coast Twins. After the 2019 season, he played in the Arizona Fall League. He did not play a minor league game in 2020 because the season was cancelled due to the COVID-19 pandemic. 

Morán started 2021 with the Wichita Wind Surge before being promoted to the St. Paul Saints. The Twins promoted him to the major leagues on September 12. He made his major league debut that night.

References

External links

1997 births
Living people
People from Mayagüez, Puerto Rico
Major League Baseball players from Puerto Rico
Major League Baseball pitchers
Minnesota Twins players
Gulf Coast Twins players
Elizabethton Twins players
Cedar Rapids Kernels players
Fort Myers Miracle players
Pensacola Blue Wahoos players
Salt River Rafters players
Wichita Wind Surge players
St. Paul Saints players
2023 World Baseball Classic players